Pavel Kuzmich (born 16 June 1988 in Krasnoyarsk) is a Russian luger who has competed since 2009. His best World Cup finish was 16th in the men's doubles event at Igls on 28 November 2009.

External links
FIL-Luge profile

1988 births
Living people
Russian male lugers
Sportspeople from Krasnoyarsk
21st-century Russian people